Erythridula is a genus of leafhoppers in the family Cicadellidae. There are at least 130 described species in Erythridula.

See also
 List of Erythridula species

References

Further reading

External links

 

Cicadellidae genera
Erythroneurini